Radim Matuš (born October 20, 1993) is a Czech professional ice hockey player. He is currently playing for Orli Znojmo of the 2nd Czech Republic Hockey League.

Matuš made his Czech Extraliga debut playing with HC Oceláři Třinec during the 2012–13 Czech Extraliga season.

References

External links

1993 births
Living people
HC Karlovy Vary players
HC Oceláři Třinec players
HC Olomouc players
Orli Znojmo players
Czech ice hockey forwards
Sportspeople from Třinec
LHK Jestřábi Prostějov players
EV Regensburg players
Bolzano HC players
Czech expatriate ice hockey players in the United States
Springfield Jr. Blues players
Czech expatriate ice hockey players in Germany
Expatriate ice hockey players in Italy
Czech expatriate sportspeople in Italy